The episodes of Akaneiro ni Somaru Saka are produced by TNK based on the original Japanese adult visual novel by Feng of the same name. The episodes are directed by Keitaro Motonaga and composed by Makoto Uezu. The anime series will be airing first on Chiba TV on October 2, 2008, and subsequently on various other broadcast stations.

Eleven pieces of theme music are used for the episodes; one opening theme and 10 ending themes. The first ending theme, "Sweet Gift" by Rie Kugimiya, used in the first two episodes; the second ending theme, "Confusion..." by Ryou Hirohashi, was used for the episode three; the third ending theme,  by Emiri Katou, was used for episode four; the fourth ending theme,  by Rie Kugimiya, was used in episode five; the fifth ending theme, "Cherry Pink Mystery" by Emiri Katou, was used in episode six; the sixth ending theme, "Make a Miracle!" by Rie Tanaka, was used in episode seven; the seventh ending theme,  by Marina Inoue, was used in the eighth episode; the eighth ending theme, "Chu.chu.ru. no yakusoku" by Rie Tanaka, was used in episode nine; the ninth ending theme,  by Aya Hirano was used in episodes ten and eleven and the tenth ending theme,  by Aya Hirano was used in episode twelve.

Episode list

References

External links
Anime official website 
Official Avex Akaneiro ni Somaru Saka website 

Akaneiro ni Somaru Saka